Azem Maksutaj (born July 8, 1975) is a former kickboxer who competed in the lightweight, welterweight, middleweight, super middleweight, light heavyweight, cruiserweight and heavyweight divisions. 
He originates from Kosovo but relocated to Switzerland at an early age where he began training in Muay Thai at fifteen. After capturing the Swiss national title at lightweight during his first year of competition in 1992, he then went on to win European and world honours 1994 while fighting around the  super middleweight mark. The late 1990s saw Maksutaj move between light heavyweight and cruiserweight, taking five world titles in those divisions, before eventually making the jump to heavyweight in 2001 where he spent the remainder of his career, acting as a journeyman in the K-1 promotion while also winning another four world titles.

Despite spending much of his career as an undersized heavyweight, Maksutaj was known for his toughness as well as his technical skill. He won a total of fourteen world titles in various weight divisions before retiring in 2010 with a hundred professional contests under his belt.

Early life
Maksutaj, a Kosovar Albanian, was born the second of four children in Deqan, SFR Yugoslavia (now Kosovo) in 1975. His father moved to Switzerland as a guest worker in the late 1970s, so he saw his father only sparingly while growing up. In 1990, at the age of fifteen, Maksutaj and the rest of his family joined up with his father in Winterthur, Switzerland during the wave of Yugoslav immigration to the country. Unable to speak the language and struggling to integrate, he soon began training in Muay Thai at the Wing Thai Gym as a way to escape his troubles.

Career

Career beginnings (1992–1997)
After just twelve months of training and his first year of competition, Maksutaj won the Swiss national Muay Thai - title in 1992 by beating Jesus Perez who was eleven years his senior by knockout in the second round.

Still just eighteen years old, he knocked out Thomas Rasmussen of Sweden on May 7, 1994, to win the European - Muay Thai title in his home town of Winterthur, before travelling to Milan, Italy later that year and defeating local fighter Sergio Bertalozzi by fifth-round KO to win the World Muay Thai Association World Middleweight (-) Championship. He lost his world title to Perry Ubeda the following year when he visited the canvas three times in the first round in Nijmegen, Netherlands on March 19, 1995.

As a rising star of Swiss kickboxing, Maksutaj was invited to fight at Japan's K-1 Fight Night, the first-ever event held by the K-1 promotion outside Japan, on June 10, 1995, in Zurich, Switzerland. There he lost to Surinamese veteran Orlando Wiet via a second-round KO. Returning to K-1 a year later at K-1 Fight Night II on June 2, 1996, he gave a "Fight of the Night" performance in a losing effort against Seido karate stylist Taiei Kin. He was knocked down in round two and lost by a unanimous decision after a five-round war. Despite failing to earn a victory on kickboxing's biggest stage, he continued to improve and ended that year's campaign with a knockout of Faizal Reding on November 2, 1996, in Zurich, to take the International Sport Karate Association World Super Middleweight strap.

Dominance at light heavyweight and cruiserweight (1998–2000)
He made the first defence of his ISKA world title against Moussa Sissoko, stopping the Frenchman inside three rounds in Winterthur on November 7, 1998. Following this, Maksutaj began to move up in weight to the light heavyweight class and established himself as one of the division's elite by making a successful return to K-1 and then winning three world titles in the space of five months in 1999. After his comeback to K-1 on June 5, 1999, at K-1 Fight Night '99, where he earned his first victory in the promotion by flooring Winston Walker three times in the third round en route to a technical knockout win, he headed to Pula, Croatia a month later to challenge double world champion Igor Ivošević. He was able to knock his opponent out in round four and came away with both the World Association of Kickboxing Organizations' Pro World Light Heavyweight and the WKA World Super Light Heavyweight belts. Maksutaj then closed the year out with a fifth world championship win, outpointing his Surinamese opponent Ashwin Balrak for the World Professional Kickboxing League (WPKL) World Light Heavyweight (-) title in Sarajevo, Bosnia and Herzegovina on December 11, 1999.

In 2000, Maksutaj moved briefly back down to super middleweight to successfully challenge for the WKA World Super Middleweight (-) Championship, winning on points over Ivica Sukošić in Pristina in his birth country of Kosovo. He would then return to light heavyweight and KO Aurélien Duarte in a World Professional Kickboxing Council (WPKC) World Light Heavyweight (-) title bout in Pavia, Italy before moving up in weight once again to cruiserweight where he knocked out Eddy Corremans in round three to be crowned the WPKC World Cruiserweight (-) Champion in Winterthur. A rematch between Maksutaj and Faizal Reding took place at K-1 Fight Night 2000 on June 3, 2000, and the Albanian came out on top again by way of TKO in round two.

Heavyweight division (2001–2010)
2001 saw Maksutaj make the transition to the heavyweight division, kicking off his career at the weight by winning the WPKC World Super Heavyweight (+) Muay Thai Championship. Following this up with a defence of his WPKC Cruiserweight title against Hubert Lisovski in Winterthur, he then earned the biggest victory of his career at that point when he dismantled Canada's Clifton Brown inside one round in front of over 100,000 spectators at the 2001 King's Cup at Sanam Luang in Bangkok, Thailand on December 6.

He would go on to compete in eight one-night tournaments in K-1's heavyweight division over the next five years and made his debut in the Grand Prix format at the K-1 World Grand Prix 2002 Preliminary Marseilles on January 25. Having scored two quick first-round KOs over Abdel Lamidi and Ferenc Gasztany in the run-up, Maksutaj lost a majority decision to Grégory Tony in the final. On April 13, 2002, Maksutaj had a re-match with Vitali Akhramenko at the K-1 World Grand Prix 2002 Preliminary Croatia in Zagreb. The pair had previously fought to a draw five years earlier and did so again as the judges could not pick a winner after five rounds. He was granted a chance at revenge against Gregory Tony the following month at the K-1 World Grand Prix 2002 in Paris, but the tall Frenchman came out on top once again by winning a five-round majority decision. The fight was close but Tony was able to floor Maksutaj with a right hand late in the final round to seal the deal.

Outside of K-1, Maksutaj picked up the WKA World Cruiserweight (-) belt from Chino Mordillo in Zurich. He forced two standing eight counts on the Spaniard, initially by damaging his arm with a blocked roundhouse kick, before finishing him off with a high kick in round two. He would finish the year on a low note, however, as he was handed his first stoppage loss in seven years by Peter Varga in Padua, Italy on November 30, 2002, to lose his WPKC Super Heavyweight Muay Thai strap.

Maksutaj returned to Marseille to compete in the K-1 World Grand Prix 2003 Preliminary France on January 24, 2003. He knocked out Rob Lloyd in the quarter-finals and outpointed Miloš Koptak in the semis, before losing to his rival Gregory Tony for the third time in the final by unanimous decision. With K-1 heading back to Switzerland with the K-1 World Grand Prix 2003 in Basel tournament on May 30, 2003, Maksutaj was invited as a participant along with seven other European heavyweight prospects. He was unable to impress in front of his home crowd, however, as he dropped a decision at the hands of Larry Lindwall at the opening stage. In his next outing a month later, Maksutaj fought outside Europe for the first time, losing a unanimous judges' decision to Shingo Koyasu at K-1 Beast II 2003 in Saitama, Japan on June 29, 2003. Breaking a three-fight losing streak, he defeated Hungarian journeyman Tihamér Brunner by decision on December 13, 2003, for the WMTA World Super Heavyweight title in a victorious homecoming to Winterthur.

Fighting at the annual Marseille K-1 qualifier for the third year running, Maksutaj went toe-to-toe with Aziz Khattou in a non-tournament bout at K-1 Marseilles 2004 World Qualification on January 24, 2004, and came out on the losing side of a split decision. A rematch with Clifton Brown in Bangkok was next up on June 11, 2004, and the outcome was the same, as Maksutaj stopped the Canadian inside the opening frame. Then, in a contest to crown arguably Switzerland's top heavyweight, he fought Björn Bregy in Zurich on September 25, 2004. He was also dropped with a right cross at the beginning of the second but made a massive comeback soon after when he felled his giant opponent with a right hook.

After a poor start to 2005 when he lost to Christian N'ka at the opening round of the K-1 France Grand Prix 2005 in Marseilles on January 19, 2005, Maksutaj next competed in the K-1 Scandinavia Grand Prix 2005 held on May 21 in Stockholm, Sweden. He was drawn against the three-time K-1 North American champion Michael McDonald in the quarter-finals, and two of the smaller, more technical heavyweights on the scene at the time traded leather in an entertaining, back-and-forth battle. In round two, McDonald forced a standing eight count on Maksutaj who then rallied back and floored him with a kick to the body. Round three saw the referee give McDonald another eight count when the Canadian took what was deemed as too long to return to his feet after being pushed over by Maksutaj. After the regulation three rounds, the bout was ruled a draw and so an extension round was added to decide the victor, in which McDonald's aggression earned him the majority decision win. McDonald took so much punishment in the fight that he could not continue in the tournament.

As their first fight was an instant classic, a rematch between Maksutaj and McDonald was promptly booked for the quarter-finals of the K-1 World Grand Prix 2005 in Las Vegas II on August 13 and saw Maksutaj advance with a unanimous decision win. In the semis, he lost to Russian amateur standout Ruslan Karaev by unanimous decision after another highly entertaining bout. A disastrous round two saw him dropped with a spinning back kick to the body in the opening seconds and then a points deduction for kneeing Karaev in the face after he had slipped to the ground. Maksutaj was knocked down again in the final round after taking a knee from Karaev. On September 24, 2005, in Winterthur, Maksutaj lost his WPKC World Super Heavyweight (+) K-1 rules title, an accolade he had won earlier in the year, to Gary Turner on points. He would add another world title to his mantle piece shortly after, though, as he knocked out Radan Frenchichi in his hometown to be crowned as the ISKA World Heavyweight (-) Champion.

On February 17, 2006, Maksutaj outfought James Phillips to a unanimous decision at the K-1 European League 2006 in Bratislava. Then, on May 20, 2006, at the K-1 Scandinavia Grand Prix 2006 in Stockholm, he KO'd his former conqueror Larry Lindwall in two to win the WMC World Heavyweight (-) Championship, his fourteenth and final world title belt. After re-matching with James Phillips in Lucerne, Switzerland on June 3, 2006, and winning on points again, Maksutaj returned to the fight capital of the world and faced the stiffest test of his career in the form of the great Ray Sefo. Going down at the K-1 World Grand Prix 2006 in Las Vegas II on August 12, 2006, Sefo sent Maksutaj to the canvas twice in round one, once in round two and twice again in three, forcing referee Steve Mazzagatti to stop the one-sided beating. He fared no better in his next match when he took on Jörgen Kruth at the K-1 World MAX North European Qualification 2007 in Stockholm on November 24, 2006, as he lost by KO from a knee midway through the opening round.

In an attempt to turn his fortunes around, he competed in the K-1 Rules Heavyweight Tournament 2007 in Turkey four-man competition in Istanbul on January 13, 2007, where he faced Kaoklai Kaennorsing, a two-time Rajadamnern Stadium champion renowned for taking fights with much larger opponents and defeating the majority of them, in the semi-finals. Although Maksutaj had the size advantage for the first time in his K-1 career, he was unable to capitalize on this, and lost by unanimous decision after an extension round. He struggled with Kaoklai's classical Thai style throughout and was given two controversial counts, one in round two and another in the extension round, although both of these strikes actually seemed to be low blows. In his next outing on May 19, 2007, he lost by technical knockout against Nathan Corbett, the eventual tournament champion, in the quarter-finals of the K-1 Fighting Network Scandinavian Qualification 2007 in Stockholm.

Maksutaj returned to the local circuit to stop his losing streak and took a number of wins including a points victory over Erhan Deniz in Bratislava, Slovakia on September 7, 2007, before returning to K-1 at the K-1 World Grand Prix 2008 in Amsterdam on April 26, 2008, to face an up-and-coming Tyrone Spong. He was outclassed by the Surinamese youngster from the start, getting dropped from a knee to the body early in the opening stanza, and knocked down again with punches at the end of the round. The second knockdown did not count as he was saved by the bell, but Spong soon finished him with another knee strike to the body in the second, bringing Maksutaj's losing streak in K-1 to five. In one of his last fights before retiring, he was awarded a disqualification win over Domagoj Ostojić after his Croatian opponent continued to punch and kick him after knocking him to the canvas in round one of their contest in Zadar, Croatia on May 11, 2008.

Maksutaj made a brief comeback to the ring to knock Jean-Luc Ajinca out in three rounds at Bern's Wankdorfhalle on January 29, 2010.

Personal life
Maksutaj got married in Winterthur, Switzerland on June 1, 2007. His son was born a few weeks later. A documentary of his life and career entitled Being Azem was released in 2010.

Championships and awards

Kickboxing
European Muay Thai Association
EMTA European Middleweight (-72.5 kg/159 lb) Championship
International Sport Karate Association
ISKA World Super Middleweight (78.1 kg/172 lb) Championship
ISKA World Heavyweight (-96.4 kg/212 lb) Championship
K-1
K-1 World Grand Prix 2002 Preliminary Marseilles Runner-up
K-1 World Grand Prix 2003 Preliminary France Runner-up
Schweizerische Muay Thai Verbände
SMTV Swiss Lightweight (-63.5 kg/140 lb) Championship
World Association of Kickboxing Organizations
WAKO Pro World Light Heavyweight (81.4 kg/179 lb) Championship
World Kickboxing Association
WKA World Super Middleweight (-76 kg/167 lb) Championship
WKA World Super Light Heavyweight (83.2 kg/183 lb) Championship
WKA World Cruiserweight (85.9 kg/189 lb) Championship
World Muay Thai Association
WMTA World Middleweight (-76.2 kg/168 lb) Championship
WMTA World Super Heavyweight Championship
World Muaythai Council
WMC World Heavyweight (-95 kg/209 lb) Championship
World Professional Kickboxing Council
WPKC World Light Heavyweight (-79 kg/174 lb) Championship
WPKC World Cruiserweight (-86 kg/189 lb) Championship
WPKC World Super Heavyweight (+95 kg/209 lb) K-1 Championship
WPKC World Super Heavyweight (+95 kg/209 lb) Muay Thai Championship
World Professional Kickboxing League
WPKL World Light Heavyweight (-79 kg/174 lb) Championship

Kickboxing record

|-
|-  bgcolor="CCFFCC"
| 2010-01-29 || Win ||align=left| Jean-Luc Ajinca || || Bern, Switzerland || KO || 3 || 
|-
|-  bgcolor="CCFFCC"
| 2008-05-11 || Win ||align=left| Domagoj Ostojić || Obračun u Ringu 8 || Zadar, Croatia || DQ (attack on a downed opponent) || 1 || 
|-
|-  bgcolor="#FFBBBB"
| 2008-04-26 || Loss ||align=left| Tyrone Spong || K-1 World Grand Prix 2008 in Amsterdam || Amsterdam, Netherlands || KO (left knee to the body) || 2 || 0:45
|-
|-  bgcolor="CCFFCC"
| 2008-00-00 || Win ||align=left| Senad Hadžić || Kings of Fullcontact || Bern, Switzerland || Decision || 3 || 3:00
|-
|-  bgcolor="CCFFCC"
| 2007-09-07 || Win ||align=left| Erhan Deniz || Noc Bojovnikov 4 || Bratislava, Slovakia || Decision || 3 || 3:00
|-
|-  bgcolor="#FFBBBB"
| 2007-05-19 || Loss ||align=left| Nathan Corbett || K-1 Fighting Network Scandinavian Qualification 2007, Quarter Finals || Stockholm, Sweden || TKO || 2 || 2:40
|-
|-  bgcolor="#FFBBBB"
| 2007-01-13 || Loss ||align=left| Kaoklai Kaennorsing || K-1 Rules Heavyweight Tournament 2007 in Turkey, Semi Finals || Istanbul, Turkey || Extension round decision (unanimous) || 4 || 3:00
|-
|-  bgcolor="#FFBBBB"
| 2006-11-24 || Loss ||align=left| Jörgen Kruth || K-1 World MAX North European Qualification 2007 || Stockholm, Sweden || KO (right knee) || 1 || 1:30
|-
|-  bgcolor="#FFBBBB"
| 2006-08-12 || Loss ||align=left| Ray Sefo || K-1 World Grand Prix 2006 in Las Vegas II || Las Vegas, Nevada, USA || TKO (referee stoppage) || 3 || 2:02
|-
|-  bgcolor="CCFFCC"
| 2006-06-03 || Win ||align=left| James Phillips || K-1 Gala in Luzern || Lucerne, Switzerland || Decision (unanimous) || 3 || 3:00
|-
|-  bgcolor="CCFFCC"
| 2006-05-20 || Win ||align=left| Larry Lindwall || K-1 Scandinavia Grand Prix 2006 || Stockholm, Sweden || KO (right punch) || 2 || 1:51
|-
! style=background:white colspan=9 |
|-
|-  bgcolor="CCFFCC"
| 2006-02-17 || Win ||align=left| James Phillips || K-1 European League 2006 in Bratislava || Bratislava, Slovakia || Decision (unanimous) || 3 || 3:00
|-
|-  bgcolor="CCFFCC"
| 2005-00-00 || Win ||align=left| Radan Frechichi || || Winterthur, Switzerland || KO || 3 || 
|-
! style=background:white colspan=9 |
|-
|-  bgcolor="CCFFCC"
| 2005-00-00 || Win ||align=left| Arthur Sequeira || || Winterthur, Switzerland || TKO (punches) || 3 || 
|-
|-  bgcolor="#FFBBBB"
| 2005-09-24 || Loss ||align=left| Gary Turner || Fight Night Winterthur || Winterthur, Switzerland || Decision (unanimous) || 5 || 3:00
|-
! style=background:white colspan=9 |
|-
|-  bgcolor="#FFBBBB"
| 2005-08-13 || Loss ||align=left| Ruslan Karaev || K-1 World Grand Prix 2005 in Las Vegas II, Semi Finals || Las Vegas, Nevada, USA || Decision (unanimous) || 3 || 3:00
|-
|-  bgcolor="CCFFCC"
| 2005-08-13 || Win ||align=left| Michael McDonald || K-1 World Grand Prix 2005 in Las Vegas II, Quarter Finals || Las Vegas, Nevada, USA || Decision (unanimous) || 3 || 3:00
|-
|-  bgcolor="#FFBBBB"
| 2005-05-21 || Loss ||align=left| Michael McDonald || K-1 Scandinavia Grand Prix 2005, Quarter Finals || Stockholm, Sweden || Extension round decision (majority) || 4 || 3:00
|-
|-  bgcolor="#FFBBBB"
| 2005-01-19 || Loss ||align=left| Christian N'ka || K-1 France Grand Prix 2005 in Marseilles, Quarter Finals || Marseille, France || Decision || 3 || 3:00
|-
|-  bgcolor="CCFFCC"
| 2004-09-25 || Win ||align=left| Björn Bregy || Fists of Fury 4 || Zurich, Switzerland || KO (right hook) || 2 || 
|-
|-  bgcolor="CCFFCC"
| 2004-06-11 || Win ||align=left| Clifton Brown || K-1 Fight || Bangkok, Thailand || KO || 1 || 2:15
|-
|-  bgcolor="#FFBBBB"
| 2004-01-24 || Loss ||align=left| Aziz Khattou || K-1 Marseilles 2004 World Qualification || Marseille, France || Decision (split) || 3 || 3:00
|-
|-  bgcolor="CCFFCC"
| 2003-12-13 || Win ||align=left| Tihamér Brunner || || Winterthur, Switzerland || Decision || 5 || 3:00
|-
! style=background:white colspan=9 |
|-
|-  bgcolor="#FFBBBB"
| 2003-06-29 || Loss ||align=left| Shingo Koyasu || K-1 Beast II 2003 || Saitama, Japan || Decision (unanimous) || 3 || 3:00
|-
|-  bgcolor="#FFBBBB"
| 2003-05-30 || Loss ||align=left| Larry Lindwall || K-1 World Grand Prix 2003 in Basel, Quarter Finals || Basel, Switzerland || Decision || 3 || 3:00
|-
|-  bgcolor="#FFBBBB"
| 2003-01-24 || Loss ||align=left| Grégory Tony || K-1 World Grand Prix 2003 Preliminary France, Final || Marseille, France || Decision (unanimous) || 3 || 3:00
|-
! style=background:white colspan=9 |
|-
|-  bgcolor="CCFFCC"
| 2003-01-24 || Win ||align=left| Miloš Koptak || K-1 World Grand Prix 2003 Preliminary France, Semi Finals || Marseille, France || Decision (unanimous) || 3 || 3:00
|-
|-  bgcolor="CCFFCC"
| 2003-01-24 || Win ||align=left| Rob Lloyd || K-1 World Grand Prix 2003 Preliminary France, Quarter Finals || Marseille, France || KO || 1 || 2:03
|-
|-  bgcolor="#FFBBBB"
| 2002-11-30 || Loss ||align=left| Peter Varga || Kickboxing Mondiale 3 || Padua, Italy || KO || 4 || 
|-
! style=background:white colspan=9 |
|-
|-  bgcolor="CCFFCC"
| 2002-00-00 || Win ||align=left| Chino Mordillo || || Zurich, Switzerland || TKO (right high kick) || 2 || 
|-
! style=background:white colspan=9 |
|-
|-  bgcolor="#FFBBBB"
| 2002-05-25 || Loss ||align=left| Grégory Tony || K-1 World Grand Prix 2002 in Paris || Paris, France || Decision (majority) || 5 || 3:00
|-
|-  style="background:#c5d2ea;"
| 2002-04-13 || Draw ||align=left| Vitali Akhramenko || K-1 World Grand Prix 2002 Preliminary Croatia || Zagreb, Croatia || Draw || 5 || 3:00
|-
|-  bgcolor="#FFBBBB"
| 2002-01-25 || Loss ||align=left| Grégory Tony || K-1 World Grand Prix 2002 Preliminary Marseilles, Final || Marseille, France || Decision (majority) || 3 || 3:00
|-
! style=background:white colspan=9 |
|-
|-  bgcolor="CCFFCC"
| 2002-01-25 || Win ||align=left| Ferenc Gasztany || K-1 World Grand Prix 2002 Preliminary Marseilles, Semi Finals || Marseille, France || KO || 1 || 0:59
|-
|-  bgcolor="CCFFCC"
| 2002-01-25 || Win ||align=left| Abdel Lamidi || K-1 World Grand Prix 2002 Preliminary Marseilles, Quarter Finals || Marseille, France || KO || 1 || 1:15
|-
|-  bgcolor="CCFFCC"
| 2001-12-06 || Win ||align=left| Clifton Brown || King's Cup 2001 || Bangkok, Thailand || KO || 1 || 
|-
|-  bgcolor="CCFFCC"
| 2001-00-00 || Win ||align=left| Hubert Lisovski || Winterthur Gladiator Fight Night || Winterthur, Switzerland || Decision || 5 || 3:00
|-
! style=background:white colspan=9 |
|-
|-  bgcolor="CCFFCC"
| 2001-00-00 || Win ||align=left| David Ismalon || || Pavia, Italy || KO || 3 || 
|-
|-  bgcolor="CCFFCC"
| 2000-06-03 || Win ||align=left| Faizal Reding || K-1 Fight Night 2000 || Zurich, Switzerland || TKO (punches) || 2 || 0:47
|-
|-  bgcolor="CCFFCC"
| 2000-00-00 || Win ||align=left| Eddy Corremans || Winterthur Asia Fight Night || Winterthur, Switzerland || KO || 3 || 
|-
! style=background:white colspan=9 |
|-
|-  bgcolor="CCFFCC"
| 2000-00-00 || Win ||align=left| Aurélien Duarte || || Pavia, Italy || KO || 4 || 
|-
! style=background:white colspan=9 |
|-
|-  bgcolor="CCFFCC"
| 2000-00-00 || Win ||align=left| Ivica Sukošić || || Pristina, Kosovo || Decision || 5 || 3:00
|-
! style=background:white colspan=9 |
|-
|-  bgcolor="CCFFCC"
| 1999-12-11 || Win ||align=left| Ashwin Balrak || || Sarajevo, Bosnia and Herzegovina || Decision || 5 || 3:00
|-
! style=background:white colspan=9 |
|-
|-  bgcolor="CCFFCC"
| 1999-07-00 || Win ||align=left| Igor Ivošević || || Pula, Croatia || KO || 4 || 
|-
! style=background:white colspan=9 |
|-
|-  bgcolor="CCFFCC"
| 1999-06-05 || Win ||align=left| Winston Walker || K-1 Fight Night '99 || Zurich, Switzerland || TKO (punches) || 3 || 2:04
|-
|-  bgcolor="CCFFCC"
| 1998-11-07 || Win ||align=left| Moussa Sissoko || || Winterthur, Switzerland || KO || 3 || 
|-
! style=background:white colspan=9 |
|-
|- style="background:#c5d2ea;"
| 1997-00-00 || Draw ||align=left| Vitali Akhramenko || || Zagreb, Croatia || Draw || 5 || 3:00
|-
|-  bgcolor="CCFFCC"
| 1996-11-02 || Win ||align=left| Faizal Reding || || Zurich, Switzerland || KO || 3 || 
|-
! style=background:white colspan=9 |
|-
|-  bgcolor="#FFBBBB"
| 1996-06-02 || Loss ||align=left| Taiei Kin || K-1 Fight Night II || Zurich, Switzerland || Decision (unanimous) || 5 || 3:00
|-
|-  bgcolor="#FFBBBB"
| 1995-06-10 || Loss ||align=left| Orlando Wiet || K-1 Fight Night || Zurich, Switzerland || KO (left punch) || 2 || 2:45
|-
|-  bgcolor="#FFBBBB"
| 1995-03-19 || Loss ||align=left| Perry Ubeda || || Nijmegen, Netherlands || KO || 1 || 
|-
! style=background:white colspan=9 |
|-
|-  bgcolor="CCFFCC"
| 1994-00-00 || Win ||align=left| Sergio Bertalozzi || || Milan, Italy || KO || 5 || 
|-
! style=background:white colspan=9 |
|-
|-  bgcolor="CCFFCC"
| 1994-05-07 || Win ||align=left| Thomas Rasmussen || || Winterthur, Switzerland || KO (punches) || 4 || 
|-
! style=background:white colspan=9 |
|-
|-  bgcolor="CCFFCC"
| 1992-00-00 || Win ||align=left| Jesus Perez || || Winterthur, Switzerland || KO || 2 || 
|-
! style=background:white colspan=9 |
|-
|-
| colspan=9 | Legend:

References

Notes

External links
 K-1Sport profile

1975 births
Living people
Albanian male kickboxers
Swiss male kickboxers
Kosovan male kickboxers
Lightweight kickboxers
Welterweight kickboxers
Middleweight kickboxers
Light heavyweight kickboxers
Cruiserweight kickboxers
Heavyweight kickboxers
Albanian Muay Thai practitioners
Swiss Muay Thai practitioners
Swiss people of Albanian descent
Swiss people of Kosovan descent
Kosovo Albanians
Albanian emigrants to Switzerland
Kosovan emigrants to Switzerland
People from Deçan
People from Winterthur